Sir Peter Geoffrey Roberts, 3rd Baronet (23 June 1912 – 22 July 1985) was a British Conservative Party politician.

He was elected at the 1945 general election as member of parliament (MP) for Sheffield Ecclesall.  When that constituency was abolished for the 1950 general election, he was elected for the newly created Sheffield Heeley constituency.  He retired from Parliament at the 1966 election, when the seat was taken by Labour candidate Frank Hooley.

Sir Peter married Judith Hempson in 1939: they had a son and four daughters. Sir Peter was succeeded as Baronet by his son Samuel, married to Georgina Cory since 1977. Lady Roberts and Sir Samuel run the Cockley Cley Estate near Swaffham.  Lady Roberts became the first woman Chairman of the Norfolk Country Landowners Association.

He was Sheriff of Hallamshire in 1970.

References

External links 
 

1912 births
1985 deaths
Baronets in the Baronetage of the United Kingdom
Conservative Party (UK) MPs for English constituencies
UK MPs 1950–1951
UK MPs 1951–1955
UK MPs 1955–1959
UK MPs 1959–1964
UK MPs 1964–1966